Jean-Michel Besnier (born 1967/1968) is a French billionaire heir. He is a major shareholder of Lactalis.

Early life
Jean-Michel Besnier was born circa 1968. His father, Michel Besnier, was the CEO of Lactalis from 1955 to 2000. His paternal grandfather, André Besnier, founded the Besnier Group (later known as Lactalis) in 1933. He has a brother, Emmanuel Besnier, who is the CEO of Lactalis, and a sister, Marie.

Career
Besnier inherited 100% of Lactalis with his brother and sister.

Wealth
His net worth was estimated by Forbes at US$6.6 billion (July 2021).

Personal life
He resides in Laval, Mayenne, France.

References

1960s births
Living people
People from Laval, Mayenne
French businesspeople
French billionaires
Jean-Michel